Susan Pettett (married name Susan Smith) (born 1956), is a female former athlete who competed for England.

Athletics career
She represented England and won a gold medal in the women's 4 × 400 metres relay with Jannette Roscoe, Ruth Kennedy and Verona Bernard, at the 1974 British Commonwealth Games in Christchurch, New Zealand.

References

1956 births
English female sprinters
Commonwealth Games medallists in athletics
Commonwealth Games gold medallists for England
Athletes (track and field) at the 1974 British Commonwealth Games
Living people
Medallists at the 1974 British Commonwealth Games